Pelargonin is an anthocyanin. It is the 3,5-O-diglucoside of pelargonidin.

Natural occurrences 
Pelargonin is a pigment, found in barberries, the petals of the scarlet pelargonium flower pomegranates, and red wine.

See also 
 Phenolic content in wine

References

External links 
 KEGG compounds
 BioPath
 

Anthocyanins